A perfluorocycloalkene (PFCA) fluorocarbon structure with a cycloalkene core. PFCAs have shown reactivity with a wide variety of nucleophiles including phenoxides, alkoxides, organometallic, amines, thiols, and azoles. They or their derivatives are reported to have nonlinear optical activity, and be useful as lubricants, etching agents, components of fuel cells, low dielectric materials, and super hydrophobic and oleophobic coatings.

Reactivity 
Derivatization of these PFCA rings via displacement of fluorine atoms with nucleophiles occurs through an addition-elimination reaction in the presence of a base. Attack of the nucleophile on the PFCA ring generates a carbanion which can eliminate a fluoride ion, resulting in vinyl substituted and allyl substituted products (Scheme 1). The ratio of vinylic to allylic products depends on the ring size, reaction conditions and nucleophile.

Under favorable conditions, a good nucleophile can replace all the fluorine atoms on PFCA ring (Scheme 2).

PFCAs have a huge potential to be used as a monomer to produce a variety of polymers. The first time, Smith et al. showed the polycondensation of bisphenols with PFCAs. A unique class of aromatic ether polymers containing perfluorocyclopentenyl (PFCP) enchainment was prepared from the simple step growth polycondensation of commercial available bisphenols and octafluorocyclopentene (OFCP) in the presence of triethylamine (Scheme 3 and 4).

Smith et al. further extended his recently published work on perfluorocyclopentenyl (PFCP) aryl ether polymers and perfuorocycloalkenyl (PFCA) aryl ether monomers, and reported the synthesis of a new class of fluoropolymers, namely, perfluorocyclohexenyl (PFCH) aryl ether polymers, via step-growth polycondensation of  commercial bisphenols and decafluorocycloalkene (DFCH)  in the presence of triethylamine (Scheme 5).

References

Fluorocarbons
Cycloalkenes